Arthur George Fulton (16 September 1887 – 26 January 1972) was a British sport shooter, who competed in the 1908 Summer Olympics and 1912 Summer Olympics.

In the 1908 Olympics he won a silver medal in the team military rifle event. Four years later he won silver medal in the team military rifle event, was sixth in the 300 metre military rifle, three positions event and 9th in the 600 metre free rifle event.

References

External links
profile

1887 births
1972 deaths
British male sport shooters
ISSF rifle shooters
Olympic shooters of Great Britain
Shooters at the 1908 Summer Olympics
Shooters at the 1912 Summer Olympics
Olympic silver medallists for Great Britain
Olympic medalists in shooting
Medalists at the 1908 Summer Olympics
Medalists at the 1912 Summer Olympics
19th-century British people
20th-century British people